Candicidin is an antifungal compound obtained from Streptomyces griseus.  It is active against some fungi including Candida albicans. Candicidin is administered intravaginally in the treatment of vulvovaginal candidiasis.

This bioactive compound was named candicidin, because of its high activity on  Candida albicans.

References 

Macrolides
Antifungals
Polyenes